Naman, New South Wales is a bounded rural locality of Coonamble Shire and a civil parish of Gowen County, New South Wales.

The Parish is on the Tunderbrine Creek a tributary of the Castlereagh River and the nearest settlement of the parish is Tooraweenah, New South Wales to the south.

The parish is on the traditional lands of the Weilwan Aboriginal people.

References

Localities in New South Wales
Geography of New South Wales
Central West (New South Wales)